Jack Murl Corgan (died 2000) was an America architect known for the theaters he designed in the Southwest and development of hotels in Las Vegas, Nevada with business partner William J. Moore.

Biography    
Corgan was born in Hugo, Oklahoma. He graduated from Oklahoma State University (OSU) in 1935. He moved to Dallas, Texas and opened his architectural firm Corgan in 1938, focusing largely on theaters and drive-ins. In 1941, he designed the first drive-in theatre. In the mid-1950s, Corgan designed the Dallas Love Field airport terminal. In 1960, Corgan was the president of the Texas Society of Architects.

Corgan is the father of architect Clifford Jack Corgan (born 1945), also known as Jack Corgan, who took over leadership of the architectural firm in the 1970s.

Works

Agnew Theater in Oklahoma City
Boomer Theater in Norman, Oklahoma
Brauntex Theatre in New Braunfels, Texas
Carver Theater (New Orleans) in New Orleans, Louisiana
Centre Theatre in El Reno, Oklahoma
Grove Theatre in Upland, California
Hornbeck Theatre in Shawnee, Oklahoma
Knob Hill Theater in Oklahoma City
Lakeside Theater in Oklahoma City
Leachman Theater in Stillwater, Oklahoma
Lynn Theatre in Gonzales, Texas
May Theater in Oklahoma City
Morley Theatre in Borger, Texas
National Theater (Texas) in Graham, Texas
Paul Poag Theatre for the Performing Arts in Del Rio, Texas
Plaza Theatre (Garland, Texas) in Garland, Texas 
Rialto Cinema in Alva, Oklahoma
Rialto Theater (Three Rivers, Texas) in Three Rivers, Texas
State Theater (Clovis, New Mexico) in Clovis, New Mexico
Vernon Plaza Theatre in Vernon, Texas
Washita Theatre in Chickasha, Oklahoma
Westland Theater in Elk City, Oklahoma
Will Rogers Theatre in Oklahoma City, Oklahoma

Notes

References

Further reading
 

2000 deaths
Architects from Oklahoma
20th-century American architects
People from Hugo, Oklahoma